An election for the Blyth Valley Borough Council was held on 4 May 1995. The Labour Party won a majority of seats and therefore control of the council. The whole council was up for election, and turnout was 35.0%.

Election result

See also 
Blyth Valley Borough Council elections

References 

Council elections in Northumberland
Blyth Valley Borough Council elections